The following television stations operate on virtual channel 44 in the United States:

 K24MI-D in Redding, California
 K31PO-D in Des Moines, Iowa
 K44GH-D in Alexandria, Minnesota
 K49EQ-D in Cortez, etc., Colorado
 KBCW in San Francisco, California
 KBVK-LD in Spencer, Iowa
 KDNF-LD in Arvada, Colorado
 KFDF-CD in Fort Smith, Arkansas
 KFFV in Seattle, Washington
 KHPF-CD in Fredericksburg, Texas
 KLEG-CD in Dallas, Texas
 KLUJ-TV in Harlingen, Texas
 KPHE-LD in Phoenix, Arizona
 KPTH in Sioux City, Iowa
 KPTP-LD in Norfolk, Nebraska
 KRJR-LD in Sacramento, California
 KTPX-TV in Okmulgee, Oklahoma
 KWBN in Honolulu, Hawaii
 KWKT-TV in Waco, Texas
 KXLA in Rancho Palos Verdes, California
 KYAM-LD in Hereford, Texas
 W06DK-D in Florence, South Carolina
 W10DD-D in San Juan, Puerto Rico
 W15DO-D in Norfolk, Virginia
 W17EB-D in Columbus, Ohio
 W20CP-D in Mansfield, Pennsylvania
 W20EI-D in Towanda, Pennsylvania
 W26DP-D in Inverness, Florida
 W29EU-D in Clarks Summit, etc., Pennsylvania
 W30ED-D in Guayama, Puerto Rico
 W31DC-D in Fort Pierce, Florida
 W33EL-D in Caguas, Puerto Rico
 W36FJ-D in Sebring, Florida
 WAGV in Harlan, Kentucky
 WEVV-TV in Evansville, Indiana
 WFFF-TV in Burlington, Vermont
 WGBX-TV in Boston, Massachusetts
 WGMB-TV in Baton Rouge, Louisiana
 WJFB in Lebanon, Tennessee
 WJTC in Pensacola, Florida
 WLMA in Lima, Ohio
 WMCN-TV in Atlantic City, New Jersey
 WOHW-LD in Lima, Ohio
 WOUC-TV in Cambridge, Ohio
 WPXH-TV in Hoover, Alabama
 WSNS-TV in Chicago, Illinois
 WSWG in Valdosta, Georgia
 WTLW-LD in Lima, Ohio
 WTOG in St. Petersburg, Florida
 WVIA-TV in Scranton, Pennsylvania
 WYBE-CD in Pinehurst, North Carolina

The following stations, which are no longer licensed, formerly operated on virtual channel 44 in the United States:
 K21NJ-D in Three Forks, Montana
 K31MX-D in Plainview, Texas
 K44KR-D in Salinas, California
 K44LG-D in Anderson/Pineville, Missouri
 KIDT-LD in Stamford, Texas
 W44CT-D in Albany, New York
 W44CU-D in Florence, South Carolina
 W44CV-D in Utuado, Puerto Rico
 W44DK-D in Clarksburg, West Virginia
 WLPH-CD in Miami, Florida
 WMKH-LD in Hilton Head Island, South Carolina
 WNDS-LD in Ocala, Florida

References

44 virtual